Because They Can is the second album from American rock group Nelson, released by Geffen Records in 1995.

The album had a shaky production history as a result of creative differences between brothers Matthew and Gunnar Nelson and the Geffen Records executives, the latter led by John Kalodner. After the success of their debut album, After the Rain, the band recorded the heavier and darker follow-up Imaginator. When Kalodner and other Geffen executives were displeased with it, Nelson was told to record a lighter album. After more than a year of writing and recording, Nelson came up with Because They Can. The band left Geffen shortly after the release of the album.

Background and recording 

After the success of their first album, After the Rain, and years of touring, Nelson returned to the studio to record their second album. They came up with a darker and harder, concept album titled Imaginator. However, when they presented the album to producer John Kalodner and the executives at Geffen Records, they weren't pleased. They then gave the band the choice to either record another album, more according to what they were expecting, or they would be released from their contract. The band decided to return to the studio and began working on a more acoustic-oriented album which was, according to Gunnar, "180 degrees in the opposite direction of Imaginator".

Because They Can was recorded at various studios such as Sound City, Studio F, Nichols Canyon Studios, Caravell Studios, Granny's House, Capitol Studios, Cactus Studios and Quarkbrain Studio. It featured original band members Brett Garsed, Paul Mirkovich, Joey Cathcart and Bobby Rock on most of the songs, and it featured guest musicians such as Mike Baird, Don Felder, Steve Porcaro and others. The album was mixed at Conway Studios.

"Won't Walk Away" was originally demoed in 1985 and an early version was performed during their 1986 Saturday Night Live appearance.  Nelson reworked the song with Jack Ponti and recorded the song as studio track for this album.

Reception

Because They Can was released in 1995, five years after the release of Nelson's first album. According to Gunnar Nelson, Geffen was not "going to put any money into promoting it". The album went mostly unnoticed and did not appear on the Billboard charts.  "(You Got Me) All Shook Up" was released to radio and video outlets, and peaked at #30 on the Radio & Records Pop chart.  On another interview, Gunnar said about the album "I’m really proud of [it], but our fanbase had gone away. Everybody had changed their musical tastes, and it was really kind of a drag".

Gunnar has also noted that People gave them the "best bad review in the history of rock 'n' roll" for Because They Can writing only "Maybe they shouldn’t". He has argued that a lot of the negative reviews they had were just based on their legacy and not in the actual music.

Track listing

Personnel

Musicians
Matthew Nelson – lead and back-up vocals, bass, 12-string electric and acoustic guitars, and rhythm guitars
Gunnar Nelson – lead and back-up vocals, 6-string guitars, rhythm guitars, gut-string acoustic guitar, tambourine and other percussion
Brett Garsed – 12 and 6-string electric guitar, high-string acoustic guitar, rhythm and lead guitars
Joey Cathcart – acoustic and electric guitar, rhythm and slide guitar
Paul Mirkovich – Hammond organ, piano, harmonium, and melodica
Bobby Rock – drums (5, 7, 11, 12, 13)
Mike Baird – drums (1, 2, 3)
Michael Botts – drums (4)
Don Felder, Kenneth Blackwell – additional mandolins
Steve Porcaro – keyboard (3)
Jeff Baxter – pedal steel guitar (4)
Eliott Easton – solo guitar (7 and 13)
Sid Sharp – concertmaster (10 and 13)

Production

John Kalodner – producer
John Boylan – producer
David J. Holman – producer, mixer and engineer (7, 11, and 13)
Guy DeFazio – engineer
Paul Grupp – engineer, mixer
Frank Wolf – engineer
Jeff Sheehan – recording assistant
Barry Taylor – recording assistant
Bjorn Thorsrud – recording assistant (7 and 13)
Tom Gordon – recording assistant (7 and 13)
Pete Doell – recording assistant (10)
Chris Henderson – recording assistant (11)
Andrew Gold – recording assistant (12)
Mick Guzauski – mixer
Marnie Riley – assistant mixer
George Marino – mastering

Art

Robin Sloane – art direction
William Wegman – photography
Teri Weigel and John Boylan – additional photography

References 

1995 albums
Nelson (band) albums
Albums produced by John Boylan (record producer)
Geffen Records albums